Stephen Patrick Mallan (born 25 March 1996) is a Scottish footballer who plays as a midfielder for  club Salford City. Mallan has previously played for St Mirren, Barnsley, Hibernian, and Yeni Malatyaspor. He has also represented Scotland in under-21 internationals.

Club career

St Mirren
Born in Glasgow, he was included in St Mirren's matchday squad for the first time on 18 October 2014, remaining on the substitutes' bench as they lost 0–1 at home against Inverness Caledonian Thistle in the Scottish Premiership. On 8 November, he was again unused as they lost by the same score against Partick Thistle, again at St Mirren Park. His debut came two weeks later as St Mirren lost 3–0 away to Hamilton Academical, starting and making way for James Marwood after 68 minutes.

Mallan scored his first goal on his fifth appearance, the team's second in a 3–1 away win against Dundee at Dens Park. BBC Sport described the goal as a "contender for goal of the season". Mallan was subsequently presented with the PFA Scotland 'Goal of the Season' award for that effort. Mallan also won the SPFL Young Player of the Month award for December 2014. Eight days later he scored his second goal, the 87th-minute winner in a 2–1 victory at Ross County. Later in January, Mallan signed a three-year contract extension with St Mirren. He scored a late winning goal against Motherwell on 16 May, but St Mirren had already been relegated to the Championship.

On 25 August 2015, Mallan equalised with a 25-yard free kick in first-half added time in a Scottish League Cup second-round game against Livingston, but his team lost 2–3 at home. He scored twice in a 4–0 win over Dunfermline Athletic on 10 October to send his team into the semi-finals of the 2015–16 Scottish Challenge Cup.

In October 2016 at Easter Road, he scored a "magnificent" free kick from 30 yards to help St Mirren eliminate Hibernian from the Challenge Cup. Mallan left St Mirren after the 2016–17 season, having made over 100 appearances for the club.

Barnsley
On 18 May 2017 Mallan completed a transfer to EFL Championship side Barnsley for an undisclosed fee. He made his competitive debut against Preston North End on Boxing Day in a 0–0 draw. Mallan made only nine appearances for Barnsley during the 2017–18 season, as they were relegated to EFL League One.

Hibernian
Mallan returned to Scottish football in July 2018, moving to Premiership club Hibernian for an undisclosed fee on a 4-year contract. He made his debut for the club on 12 July in a 2018–19 UEFA Europa League qualification tie at home to Faroese side NSÍ Runavík, scoring twice in a 6–1 Hibs win. Mallan had a productive first season with Hibs, scoring 13 goals in 48 appearances. After 3 goals in 26 appearances during the first part of the 2019–20 season, he suffered a knee injury in late December.

Yeni Malatyaspor
Mallan was loaned to Turkish Super Lig club Yeni Malatyaspor for the rest of the season, with an option to buy at the end of the season, on 1 February 2021. In July, Mallan moved on a permanent basis to Malatyaspor, signing a two-year contract with the club.

Salford City
On 30 June 2022, Mallan returned to England to join League Two club Salford City on a two-year deal.

International career
In March 2017 he made his debut for the Scotland Under-21 side in a friendly against Estonia.

Personal life
Stevie is the latest of four generations of Mallan men to play football at a high level. His great-grandfather Jim or Jimmy, a defender, played for Celtic and St Mirren, being selected for the Scottish Football League XI with the former and playing in the 1955 Scottish League Cup Final with the latter. His grandfather, also Jimmy, played Junior football as a striker, scoring a hat-trick for Johnstone Burgh in the 1964 Scottish Junior Cup final. His father Stevie, a striker born in 1967, played for several Scottish Football League clubs in the 1990s, and after moving to the Juniors in his mid-30s, played for several more years and appeared in the 2011 Scottish Junior Cup Final at the age of 44.

Career statistics

Notes

References

External links

1996 births
Living people
Footballers from Glasgow
Stevie
Association football midfielders
Scottish footballers
Scotland under-21 international footballers
St Mirren F.C. players
Barnsley F.C. players
Hibernian F.C. players
Yeni Malatyaspor footballers
Salford City F.C. players
Scottish Professional Football League players
Süper Lig players
English Football League players
Scottish expatriate footballers
Expatriate footballers in Turkey
Scottish expatriate sportspeople in Turkey